Gilbert Saroni, also written Gilbert Sarony, was a cross-dressing performer in vaudeville as well as early Edison Manufacturing, American Mutoscope, and Siegmund Lubin films. In his obituary in Variety he was described as one of the first impersonators of the "old maid" type and was said to be "considered one of the funniest men in the show business."

His vaudeville performances included minstrel shows where he donned blackface using burnt cork and mimicked African-American characters. He also performed with song and dance team Kelly and Waters. He appeared in a series of early Edison films with Old Maid in the title and had catchphrases.

His performances used pronounced facial expressions for levity.

He was a best man at Annie Hindle's wedding. He died of acute indigestion in Pittsburgh on December 15, 1910.

Filmography
How Bridget Made the Fire (1900)
The Finish of Bridget McKeen (1901)
Old Maid in the Drawing Room (1901)
Old Maid Having Her Picture Taken (1901)
The Old Maid in the Horsecar (1901)
Gilbert Saroni Preparing for His Act (1903), a Siegmund Lubin film
The Old Maid’s Lament (1903)
Burglar and Old Maid (1903)
Country Sport and Old Maid (1903)
The Farmer and the Old Maid (1903)
Giddy Old Maid (1903)
Old Maid Courtship (1903)
Old Maid’s Ballet Dance (1903)
The Old Maid’s Lament (1903) 
Old Maid’s Morning Greeting (1903)
Old Maid's First Visit to a Theater (1903)

References

1910 deaths
20th-century American male actors
American male silent film actors
Blackface minstrel performers
Female impersonators
Place of birth missing
Vaudeville performers
Year of birth missing